The white-winged duck or white-winged wood duck (Asarcornis scutulata) is a large species of duck, formerly placed in the genus Cairina with the Muscovy duck (Cairina moschata) and allied with the dabbling ducks. However, mtDNA cytochrome b and NADH dehydrogenase subunit 2 sequence analysis indicate that the anatomical similarity to the Muscovy duck is deceiving and that the species is appropriately placed in a monotypic genus, as Asarcornis scutulata, which is evolutionarily closer to the redhead (Aythya americana, one of the diving ducks).

Description
This is one of the largest living species of duck next only to the steamer ducks which are heavier. The Muscovy duck also attains sizes that nearly rival the white-winged duck, but may average a bit smaller in a wild state. Males weigh , while females weigh . The most noticeable feature on adult birds, is the dark body contrasting with a whitish head and neck. Males have mostly dull yellowish bill, blackish mottling on the head and upper neck, white lesser median coverts and inner edges of tertials and bluish-grey secondaries. In flight, white wing-coverts contrast with the rest of the wings. Females are smaller and usually have more densely mottled head and upper neck. The juvenile is duller and browner.

This secretive species is only known to feed at night. Its diet consists of seeds, aquatic plants, grain, rice, snails, small fish and insects. It inhabits stagnant or slow-flowing natural and artificial wetlands, within or adjacent to evergreen, deciduous or swamp forests, on which it depends for roosting and nesting, usually in tree holes. Although lowlands (below c.200 m) provide optimum habitat, it occurs up to 1,400 m of altitude, especially on plateaus supporting sluggish perennial rivers and pools.

Distribution and status
Historically, the white-winged duck was widely distributed from northeastern India and Bangladesh, throughout South East Asia to Java and Sumatra. It is now extinct in Java. In India, the duck is found only in the northeastern part of the country, with the main concentration in eastern Assam and adjacent areas of Arunachal Pradesh. However, in 2002 it had a population of only 800, with about 200 in Laos, Thailand, Vietnam and Cambodia, 150 on Sumatra, notably in Way Kambas National Park and 450 in India, Bangladesh and Burma.

In India, the key protected areas for the white-winged duck are Dibru-Saikhowa National Park, Dihing-Patkai Wildlife Sanctuary, Nameri National Park and Namdapha National Park.

The white-winged duck occurs in dense tropical evergreen forests, near rivers and swamps.

They tend to nest in tree cavities, and are threatened in part since the destruction of hollow trees is destroying their nesting localities. The draining of swamps and rivers and other forms of habitat destruction is also destroying the habitat that they could survive in. Additional threats include loss of genetic variability, disturbance, hunting, and collection of eggs and chicks for food or pets.

Due to ongoing habitat loss, a small population size, and because this duck is hunted for food, eggs and pets, the white-winged duck is evaluated as Endangered on the IUCN Red List of Threatened Species. It is listed on Appendix I of CITES. The white-winged duck is also found in the central Sumatra province of Riau, specifically in the peatland Acacia plantations of a large pulp and paper company. The plantations, at least temporarily, provide suitable habitat between periodic harvests (once every 4–5 years). The ducks are frequently observed along canals where large and overhanging Acacia trees provide shade and cover from predators and a haven in which to feed and rest. The quiet and still water in the canals of the plantations provides an undisturbed and secluded location, away from local communities which may hunt the ducks or collect their eggs. Nearby, natural forest conservation areas and greenbelts also provide suitable nesting and roosting habitat in close proximity to the canals.

It is the state bird of the Indian state of Assam.

There have been efforts to preserve the population by breeding in captivity in England. It has been seen that they do well under shady, dimly-lit conditions, but there is also a higher chance for them to contract avian tuberculosis.

References

External links 

white-winged duck
white-winged duck
Birds of Southeast Asia
Birds of Northeast India
Fauna of Assam
white-winged duck
Symbols of Assam